Matthias Bernard Braun (Czech: Matyáš Bernard Braun, 24 February 1684 in Sautens near Innsbruck – 15 February 1738 in Prague) was a sculptor and carver active in the Czech lands, one of the most prominent late baroque style sculptors in the area.

Matthias Bernard Braun was born as the fifth child of Jacob Braun and Magdalene born Neureuter. He apprenticed in Austria (Salzburg) and Italy (Venice, Bologna, Rome). And in his work, it is the Italian influence, that is the most prominent. He was inspired by Michelangelo Buonarroti, Gian Lorenzo Bernini and by the Venetian sculptural school of the 17th century and thus became a great propagator of the Italian-provenience sculpture in the Central-European context.

Some time before 1710, Braun came to visit Prague, already as a full-fledged artist creating from sandstone, and soon he became domestic in Bohemia. He found his wife and friends there, and became a citizen to the New Town of Prague. Already his first work - the statuary of the Vision of St. Luthgard (Czech: Vidění sv. Luitgardy) from 1710, situated on Charles Bridge in Prague - brought to him much attention and many new orders. Braun then was able to found the biggest workshop in Prague, employing six journeymen and having an income of 900 golden a year around 1725. Soon, he himself could not manage the number of new commissions for Prague palaces, gardens, churches and many other places in Bohemia, a situation worsened by the progressing tuberculosis. That is why he only created the designs and models, had his cooperators realize them and completed the work into the final appearance. He had five children, none of which continued his work, though. He died in Prague in 1738.

Matthias Braun is probably the most famous for his collection of the allegories of Virtues and Vices situated at the Kuks Hospital in Bohemia, a commission of count František Antonín Špork. Other notable sculptures include: the Bethlehem - monumental statues chiselled directly in sandstone rocks near Kuks, forty pitoresque statues of dwarfs at the Kuks race-course, several statuaries at Charles Bridge in Prague, statues in the St. Kliment's church (Prague), the stone pillar of the Holy Trinity in Teplice, the sculptures in the interior of Czernin palace (Prague), and many others.

There is an asteroid named Mathiasbraun (number 6768), discovered in 1983.

See also
 Statue of Ivo of Kermartin, Charles Bridge
 Statue of Saint Ludmila, Charles Bridge

External links

 An online tour of the Betlehem sculptures
 The Rescue of M. Braun's Area by Kuks
 Some more biographic info
 The allegories of Virtues and Vices at Kuks (Czech text, and photos)

Books about Braun
 Neumann, Jaromír: Český barok. Praha: Odeon 1968, 2.vyd. 1975 
 Poche, Emanuel: Matyáš Bernard Braun, sochař českého baroka a jeho dílna. Praha: Odeon 1986 
 Blažíček, Oldřich J.: Sochařství vrcholného baroka v Čechách, v: Dějiny českého výtvarného umění, díl II/2. Praha 1989
 Kořán, Ivo: Karlův most. Praha: Odeon 1989.
 Hoferica, Jilji: 3x Mathias Bernard Braun. Praha 2012
 Hoferica Jilji: Mathias Braun a Georg Patzak. Praha 2013
 

Durant James (2007)
Jordan Videcoqs (2012)
Machias Brownlli (CKS)

1684 births
1738 deaths
Austrian sculptors
Austrian male sculptors
Czech Baroque sculptors
Czech male sculptors